Kenneth "Ken" Jurkowski (born September 2, 1981, in Rhinebeck, New York) is an American rower. He finished 11th in the men's single sculls at the 2008 Summer Olympics.

References 
 
 

1981 births
American male rowers
Living people
People from Rhinebeck, New York
Olympic rowers of the United States
Pan American Games competitors for the United States
Rowers at the 2008 Summer Olympics
Rowers at the 2011 Pan American Games
Rowers at the 2012 Summer Olympics
World Rowing Championships medalists for the United States